Gobarwahi railway station serves Gobarwahi a large village located north of Tumsar and nearby villages in Bhandara district in Maharashtra, India.

References

Railway stations in Bhandara district
Nagpur SEC railway division